The Gas Dynamic Trap is a magnetic mirror machine being operated at the Budker Institute of Nuclear Physics in Akademgorodok, Russia.

Technical specifications 
Dimensions
The plasma inside the machine fills a cylinder of space, 7 meters long and 28 centimeters in diameter.  The magnetic field varies along this tube.  In the center the field is low; reaching (at most) 0.35 Teslas.  The field rises to as high as 15 Teslas at the ends.  This change in the strength is needed to reflect the particles and get them internally trapped (see: the magnetic mirror effect).

Heating
The plasma is heated using two methods, simultaneously.  The first is neutral beam injection, where a hot (25 keV), neutral beam of material is shot into the machine at a rate of 5 megawatts.  The second is Electron cyclotron resonance heating, where electromagnetic waves are used to heat a plasma, analogous to microwaving it. 
 
Performance
As of 2016, the machine had achieved a plasma trapping beta of 0.6 for 5 milliseconds.  It had reached an electron temperature of 1 keV using the method of Electron cyclotron resonance heating.  It had reached an ion density of 1×1020 ions/m3.  The machine loses material out of the ends of the mirror  but material is replenished at such a rate as to maintain a density inside the machine.

Diagnostics 
During any given experiment, operators can choose from at least 15 fusion diagnostics to measure the machines' behavior: 
 Thomson Scattering
 Motional Stark Effect
 CX Energy Analysis (2)
 Rutherford Ion Scattering
 Ion End Loss Analyzer
 Microwave Interferometer
 Dispersion Interferometer
 Diamagnetic Loops
 Langmuir Probes
 Pyro electric Detectors
 RF Probes
 Beam Dump Calorimeters
 NBI Sec. Electron Detectors
 Neutron Detectors
 Thermonuclear Proton Detectors

Pictures of the GDT

References

Magnetic confinement fusion devices
Budker Institute of Nuclear Physics